Çağıran is a surname of Turkish origin. Notable with the surname include:

Evren Çağıran (born 1993), Turkish compound archer
Merve Çağıran (born 1992), Turkish actress
Musa Çağıran (born 1992), Turkish footballer
Rahman Buğra Çağıran (born 1995), Turkish footballer